This is a list of streets in the 1st arrondissement of Paris with etymological information.

A 

 Rue Adolphe-Jullien - Adolphe Jullien (1803-1873) - director of the Chemins de fer de l'Ouest railway
 Quai Aimé-Césaire - Aimé Césaire (1913-2008) -  writer and representative of Martinique in the National Assembly
 Rue d'Alger - in commemoration of the capture of Algiers by French forces on July 5, 1830
 Rue de l'Amiral-de-Coligny - Admiral Gaspard II de Coligny (1519-1572)
 Allée André-Breton - André Breton (1896-1966) - writer
 Place André-Malraux - André Malraux (1901-1976) - writer and politician
 Passage Antoine-Carême - Marie-Antoine Carême (1784-1833) - chef
 Rue de l'Arbre-Sec
 Rue d'Argenteuil - Argenteuil, a commune in Val-d'Oise
 Pont des Arts - named due to its proximity to the Louvre

B 

 Rue Baillet - Jean Baillet, treasurer to Charles V of France
 Rue Bailleul  - Robet Bailleul, accounts clerk who lived on the street
 Allée Baltard - Victor Baltard (1805-1874), architect
 Rue Basse - named due to its proximity to Place Basse
 Passage de Beaujolais - named due to its proximity to the Rue de Beaujolais
 Rue de Beaujolais - comte de Beaujolais, a title given to sons of the Duke of Orléans
 Rue Berger - Jean Jacque Berger (1791-1859), prefect of the Seine
 Rue Bertin-Poirée - Bertin Poirée, a resident of the street
 Allée Blaise-Cendrars - Blaise Cendrars (1877-1961), writer
 Rue des Bons-Enfants - Collège des Bons-Enfants
 Rue Boucher - Pierre-Richard Boucher, politician
 Rue du Bouloi - a hotel once situated there
 Impasse des Bourdonnais - named due to its proximity to the Rue des Bourdonnais
 Rue des Bourdonnais - Adam and Guillaume Bourdon, Mathematician

C 

 Rue Cambon - Pierre-Joseph Cambon (1756-1820), politician
 Rue des Capucines - a former Capuchin convent
 Place du Carrousel - named for the military carrousel (dressage) given for the birth of Louis, Grand Dauphin
 Pont du Carrousel - named due to its proximity to the Place du Carrousel
 Rue de Castiglione - Battle of Castiglione
 Rue Catinat - Nicolas Catinat (1637-1712), Marshal of France
 Pont au Change - named for the money changers once established there
 Place du Châtelet - once the site of the Grand Châtelet
 Rue du Chevalier-de-Saint-George - Chevalier de Saint-Georges (1739-1799), musician
 Rue Clémence-Royer - Clémence Royer (1830-1902), philosopher and economist
 Place Colette - Colette (1873-1954), writer
 Rue du Colonel-Driant - Émile Driant (1855-1916), military officer
 Rue Coq-Héron - so named in 1298
 Rue Coquillière  - named for a city gate
 Rue de la Cossonnerie - named for an ancient poultry market
 Rue Courtalon - Guillaume Courtalon, a former resident
 Rue Croix-des-Petits-Champs - named for a cross once situated here
 Rue du Cygne - swan

D 

 Rue Danielle-Casanova - Danielle Casanova (1909-1943), member of the French Resistance
 Place Dauphine - Louis XIII of France (1601-1643), monarch
 Rue des Déchargeurs - unloaders
 Rue des Deux-Boules - two balls
 Place des Deux-Écus - two Écus
 Passage des Deux-Pavillons - named for the two pavilions at the corner of it and the Rue de Beaujolais
 Rue Duphot - Mathurin-Léonard Duphot (1769-1797)

E 
 Rue de l'Échelle - named for the Archbishop's ladder
 Place de l'École - school
 Rue Édouard-Colonne - Édouard Colonne (1838-1910), conductor
 Rue Étienne-Marcel - Étienne Marcel (1310-1358), provost of Paris

F 

 Allée Federico-Garcia-Lorca - Federico García Lorca (1899-1936), poet
 Cour des Fermes - former location of the Ferme générale
 Rue de la Ferronnerie - named for the ironworks which were located here
 Rue Française - a corruption of the former name of Rue Françoise, named for Francis I of France (1494-1547)
 Quai François-Mitterrand - François Mitterrand (1915-1996), President of France

G 
 Avenue du Général-Lemonnier - Ḗmile Lemonnier (1893-1945), general
 Voie Georges-Pompidou - Georges Pompidou (1911-1974), President of France
 Impasse Gomboust - named due to its proximity to the Rue Gomboust
 Rue Gomboust - Jacques Gomboust, engineer to the King
 Rue de la Grande-Truanderie - named for duties which were collected nearby

H 

 Rue des Halles - named for the central market at its terminus
 Rue de Harlay - Achille Harlay de Sancy (1581-1646), intellectual and diplomat
 Rue Henri-Robert - Henri-Robert (1863-1936), lawyer and historian
 Rue Herold - Ferdinand Hérold (1791-1833), composer
 Quai de l'Horloge - clock
 Passage Hulot - Monsieur Hulot, a former resident

I 
 Rue des Innocents - site of the former Holy Innocents' Cemetery

J 

 Passage des Jacobins - formerly the site of the Jacobin convent
 Rue Jean-Jacques-Rousseau - Jean-Jacques Rousseau (1712-1778), philosopher
 Rue Jean-Lantier - corruption of the old name rue Jean-Lointier
 Rue Jean-Tison - Jean Tison, a 13th-century resident
 Place Joachim-du-Bellay - Joachim du Bellay (1522-1560), poet
 Rue du Jour - day
 Allée Jules-Supervielle - Jules Supervielle (1884-1960), poet

L 
 Rue de La Sourdière - Monsieur de la Faye, sieur de la Sourdière
 Rue La Feuillade - François d'Aubusson de La Feuillade (1625-1691), Marshal of France
 Rue La Vrillière - The Hotel de la Vrilliere was located nearby.
 Rue des Lavandières-Sainte-Opportune - the washerwomen
 Passerelle Léopold-Sédar-Senghor - Léopold Sédar Senghor (1906-2011), President of Senegal
 Place du Lieutenant-Henri-Karcher - Henri Karcher (1908-1983), member of the French Resistance
 Passage des Lingères - previously the site of the Porte des Lingères
 Rue de la Lingerie - seamstresses
 Rue des Lombards - Lombard moneychangers used to reside there.
 Allée Louis-Aragon - Louis Aragon (1897-1982), poet
 Place du Louvre - the Louvre
 Port du Louvre - the Louvre
 Rue du Louvre - the Louvre

M 
 Boulevard de la Madeleine
 Place du Marché-Saint-Honoré
 Rue du Marché-Saint-Honoré
 Rue de Marengo
 Place Marguerite-de-Navarre
 Rue Mauconseil
 Place Maurice-Barrès
 Place Maurice-Quentin
 Quai de la Mégisserie
 Place Mireille
 Rue Molière
 Passage Mondétour
 Rue Mondétour
 Rue de Mondovi
 Rue de la Monnaie
 Rue Montesquieu
 Rue Montmartre
 Rue Montorgueil
 Rue de Montpensier
 Rue du Mont-Thabor
 Rue des Moulins

N 

 Pont Neuf - to distinguish it from bridges built previously

O 
 Avenue de l'Opéra
 Rue de l'Oratoire
 Quai des Orfèvres
 Rue des Orfèvres
 Rue de l'Orient-Express

P 
 Boulevard du Palais
 Place du Palais-Royal
 Rue du Pélican
 Rue Perrault
 Rue de la Petite-Truanderie
 Rue des Petits-Champs
 Place Pierre-Emmanuel
 Rue Pierre-Lescot
 Rue du Plat-d'Étain
 Place du Pont-Neuf
 Rue du Pont-Neuf
 Passage Potier
 Rue des Prêcheurs
 Rue des Prêtres-Saint-Germain-l'Auxerrois
 Rue des Prouvaires
 Place des Pyramides
 Rue des Pyramides

R 

 Rue Radziwill
 Rue Rambuteau
 Passage de la Reine-de-Hongrie
 Place René-Cassin
 Rue de La Reynie
 Passage de Richelieu
 Rue de Richelieu
 Rue de Rivoli
 Rue de Rohan
 Rue Rouget-de-L'Isle
 Rue du Roule
 Pont Royal

S 
 Rue Saint-Denis
 Rue Sainte-Anne
 Place Sainte-Opportune
 Rue Sainte-Opportune
 Impasse Saint-Eustache
 Rue Saint-Florentin
 Rue Saint-Germain-l'Auxerrois
 Rue Saint-Honoré
 Rue Saint-Hyacinthe
 Allée Saint-John-Perse
 Pont Saint-Michel
 Passage Saint-Roch
 Rue Saint-Roch
 Rue Sauval
 Boulevard de Sébastopol

T 
 Rue Thérèse
 Impasse des Trois-Visages
 Port des Tuileries
 Quai des Tuileries
 Rue de Turbigo

V 
 Place de Valois
 Rue de Valois
 Rue Vauvilliers
 Cour Vendôme
 Place Vendôme
 Rue de Ventadour
 Passage Vérité
 Galerie Véro-Dodat
 Rue de Viarmes
 Place des Victoires
 Avenue Victoria
 Rue Villedo
 Rue du Vingt-Neuf-Juillet
 Galerie Vivienne
 Rue Vivienne
 Rue Volney

References

Bibliography
 
 

 
Paris
streets in the 1st arrondissement of Paris